Corymbia pachycarpa, commonly known as the urn-fruited bloodwood,  mawurru, yilanggi or warlamarn, is a species of stunted tree or mallee that is endemic to northern Australia. It has thick, tessellated bark on the trunk and branches, a crown of heart-shaped, egg-shaped or lance-shaped leaves, flower buds in groups of three or seven, white flowers and urn-shaped to barrel-shaped fruit.

Description
It has rough, brownish tessellated and fissured bark on the trunk and branches. Flowering has been observed in December and the flowers are white.

Taxonomy and naming
Corymbia pachycarpa was first formally in 1995 by Ken Hill and Lawrie Johnson. The Jaru peoples know the tree as  mawurru, yilanggi or warlamarn. The specific epithet (pachycarpa) is from the Greek pachys meaning "thick" and karpos, latinised as carpus, "a fruit", referring to the large, thick-walled fruit.

Distribution and habitat
This eucalypt grows in arid part of northern Western Australia and adjacent parts of the Northern Territory. Its range extends from the Great Sandy Desert to near Western Australia and east through the fringes of the Tanami Desert to Wave Hill Station in the Northern Territory.

See also
 List of Corymbia species

References

pachycarpa
Myrtales of Australia
Flora of Western Australia
Flora of the Northern Territory
Plants described in 1995